Geschichten übern Gartenzaun is an East German television series.

See also
List of German television series

External links
 

1982 German television series debuts
1985 German television series endings
German-language television shows
Television in East Germany